The 2016 ConIFA World Football Cup qualification is a process to decide a number of the teams that will play in the 2016 ConIFA World Football Cup. Unlike the previous tournament, this will be the first one that will use a measure of qualification. The first qualification match played was on 30 May 2015 between the newly constituted Felvidék team and the team representing Alderney, with the first goal scored by Felvidék's Zoltán Novota.

Background
The Confederation of Independent Football Associations (ConIFA) was founded in June 2013, as an organisation to represent football associations that are not eligible or choose not to join FIFA. One year later, it held its first official tournament, the 2014 ConIFA World Football Cup, in Sweden, to which the twelve participating teams were invited. The success of this tournament led to the decision to make it a biannual competition, with continental tournaments taking place in between, the first of which was the 2015 ConIFA European Football Cup.

During the planning process for the European Football Cup, ConIFA took the decision that, in addition to finding its first European champions, the competition would also serve as a qualification tournament for the 2016 World Football Cup, with the top three teams gaining automatic entry into the WFC. The finalised European Football Cup eventually featured a total of six teams, including both the current WFC champions, Countea de Nissea, and the runners up, Ellan Vannin. A number of the participants undertook warm-up games prior to the start of the tournament, with Ellan Vannin planning a pair of back-to-back charity games over the weekend of the 30–31 May against Alderney. However, in mid-May 2015, a few weeks prior to the fixtures taking place, the fixtures as planned were cancelled and replaced by a four team tournament called the Niamh Challenge Cup, with Ellan Vannin and Alderney joined by teams representing Felvidék and Punjab. At the same time, ConIFA announced that they were officially sanctioning the tournament, with the winners gaining automatic entry to the WFC. A second tournament, the Benedikt Fontana Cup, hosted in Switzerland by the Fussballauswahl Raetia, was announced as taking place in parallel with the EFC in June 2015, with three participants, including the hosts Raetia, Felvidék and the Chagos Islands. ConIFA also announced that this too would serve as a qualification tournament for the WFC, with the winner gaining automatic entry.

In addition to the qualification process that ConIFA put in place, the organisation announced in May that it had reached an agreement with the football association representing the Aymara people for their team to be the first South Americans to play at the World Football Cup.

On 7 July ConIFA announced that Abkhazia had been selected as the host of the 2016 ConIFA World Football Cup, which simultaneously means they will be taking part.

In December 2015, following advice from the UK Foreign and Commonwealth Office over security concerns regarding travel to Abkhazia, the Manx Independent Football Alliance announced that the Ellan Vannin team would withdraw from the World Football Cup, and instead take part in the 2016 Europeada Championship in Italy.

Qualified teams

Qualification
In the qualification process, Ellan Vannin and Felvidek had two opportunities to qualify; through the Niamh Challenge Cup and the ConIFA European Football Cup.

Niamh Challenge Cup
The Niamh Challenge Cup was a four-team knockout tournament over two days; the winners of the two games played on the first day advanced to the final, with the winner of that game qualifying automatically for the WFC.

2015 European Football Cup
The 2015 European Football Cup featured a total of six teams, divided into two groups of three for the first round. The top two in each group advanced to the semi-finals. The winner of the tournament, runner-up and team that finished third were automatically awarded places in the 2016 World Football Cup.

Benedikt Fontana Cup
The Benedikt Fontana Cup was planned as a two-game tournament held over two days in June 2015 between Raetia and the Chagos Islands, with the winners automatically qualifying for the World Football Cup. The competition was originally planned as a three-team tournament, with Panjab and Felvidek due to take part alongside the hosts. Panjab were forced to withdraw in May 2015, and were replaced by the Chagos Islands. Subsequently, Felvidek also withdrew, leaving it as a two-legged tie, with the winner (and qualification place) decided by the aggregate score. In June 2015, just prior to the event taking place, the competition was cancelled by the Raetia FA as a result of the Chagos team pulling out, and re-scheduled for August 2015. The Raetia FA announced that the tournament would be played as a single game against Franconia on Sunday 6 September.

References

CONIFA World Football Cup
International association football competitions hosted by Hungary
International association football competitions hosted by Switzerland
2015 in association football
2015 in Hungarian sport
2015 in Swiss sport
Con
Football competitions in the Isle of Man
Sport in Debrecen